Sir Thomas Chaworth (died 1459) was an English landowner and Member of Parliament.

Life
He was the son and heir of Alice and Sir William Chaworth of Wiverton and Alfreton. His mother Alice (née Caltoft) brought a considerable fortune to the family. She was the heir to her fathers manors at Wiverton, East Bridgford, Saxby, West Allington and South Thoresby, Lincolnshire. His father died in 1398 and his mother died in 1400.

Chaworth succeeded his father in 1398 and was knighted in 1401.

From 1401 he served on many public commissions throughout his life.

He was appointed Sheriff of Nottinghamshire and Derbyshire for 1403, 1417 and 1423. He was Sheriff of Lincolnshire for 1408 and 1418.

He was elected to Parliament as knight of the shire (MP) for Nottinghamshire in 1406, followed by a term as MP for Derbyshire in 1413, after which he was again returned for Nottinghamshire several times between 1417 and 1445.

He was a Justice of the Peace for Nottinghamshire from 1404 to 1417, 1419 to 1424 and 1429 to his death and for Derbyshire from 1444 to his death.

He married twice: firstly Nicola, daughter of Sir Reynold Braybrooke, with whom he had a daughter and secondly Isabel, the daughter of Sir Thomas Aylesbury, and coheiress of Hugh Aylesbury of Milton Keynes, Buckinghamshire, with whom he had several sons and a daughter. He was succeeded by his eldest son William.

References

1459 deaths
English landowners
English knights
High Sheriffs of Yorkshire
High Sheriffs of Derbyshire
High Sheriffs of Nottinghamshire
English MPs 1406
Year of birth unknown
English MPs May 1413
English MPs 1417
English MPs 1420
English MPs May 1421
English MPs 1423
English MPs 1437
English MPs 1445
Members of the Parliament of England (pre-1707) for constituencies in Derbyshire